Na-Dene (also Nadene, Na-Dené, Athabaskan–Eyak–Tlingit, Tlina–Dene) is a family of Native American languages that includes at least the Athabaskan languages, Eyak, and Tlingit languages. Haida was formerly included, but is now considered doubtful. By far the most widely spoken Na-Dene language today is Navajo.

In February 2008, a proposal connecting Na-Dene (excluding Haida) to the Yeniseian languages of central Siberia into a Dené–Yeniseian family was published and well-received by a number of linguists. It was proposed in a 2014 paper that the Na-Dene languages of North America and the Yeniseian languages of Siberia had a common origin in a language spoken in Beringia, between the two continents.

Etymology 
Edward Sapir originally constructed the term Na-Dene to refer to a combined family of Athabaskan, Tlingit, and Haida (the existence of the Eyak language was not known to him at the time). In his “The Na-Dene languages: A preliminary report”, he describes how he arrived at the term (Sapir 1915, p. 558):

Family division 

In its uncontroversial core, Na-Dene consists of two branches, Tlingit and Athabaskan–Eyak:
 Tlingit: 1,360 speakers
 Athabaskan–Eyak
 Eyak: the last native speaker died in 2008
 Athabaskan
 Northern
 Pacific Coast
 Southern

For linguists who follow Edward Sapir in connecting Haida to the above languages, Haida represents an additional branch, with Athabaskan–Eyak–Tlingit together forming the other. Dene or Dine (the Athabaskan languages) is a widely distributed group of Native languages spoken by associated peoples in Alberta, British Columbia, Manitoba, Northwest Territories, Nunavut, Saskatchewan, Yukon, Alaska, parts of Oregon, northern California, and the American Southwest as far as northern Mexico.

The southwestern division of Athabaskan is also called Southern Athabaskan or Apachean, and includes Navajo and all the Apache languages. Eyak was spoken in south-central Alaska; the last first language speaker died in 2008. Navajo is by far the most widely spoken language of the Na-Dene family, spoken in Arizona, New Mexico, and other regions of the American Southwest.

Typological profile of Athabaskan–Eyak–Tlingit

All of these languages share a highly complex prefixing verb structure in which tense and mood markers are interdigitated between subject and object agreement markers. The morphological hallmark of the family is a series of prefixes found directly before the verb root that raise or lower the transitivity of the verb word. These prefixes, traditionally known as "classifiers", derive historically from a combination of three distinct classes of morphemes and are not found in any other Native American language family.

The phoneme system contains a large number of dorsal (velar or uvular) consonants (fronting in many modern Athabaskan languages to palatals and velars, correspondingly) as well as a general absence of labial obstruents (except where /b/ has arisen from *w). In the historical phonology there is a widespread tendency, observable across many Athabaskan languages, for phonemic tonal distinctions to arise from glottal features originally found at the end of the syllable. The glottal features in question are often evident in Eyak or Tlingit. These languages are typologically unusual in containing extensive prefixation yet being SOV and postpositional, features normally associated with suffixing languages.

Proposals of deeper genealogical relations involving Athabaskan–Eyak–Tlingit
A genealogical connection between the Tlingit, Eyak and Athabaskan languages was suggested early in the 19th century, but not universally accepted until much later. Haida, with 15 fluent speakers (M. Krauss, 1995), was originally linked to Tlingit by Franz Boas in 1894. Both Haida and Tlingit were then connected to Athabaskan by Edward Sapir in 1915. Linguists such as Lyle Campbell (1997) today consider the evidence inconclusive. They have classified Haida as a language isolate. In order to emphasise the exclusion of Haida, Campbell refers to the language family as Athabaskan–Eyak–Tlingit rather than Na-Dene. In 2010 Jeff Leer published extensive primary materials on what he calls PAET (Proto-Athabaskan–Eyak–Tlingit).

Dené–Yeniseian

In 2008, Edward Vajda of Western Washington University presented evidence suggesting that the Na-Dene languages (Athabaskan–Eyak–Tlingit) might be related to the Yeniseian (or Yeniseic) languages of Siberia, the only living representative of which is the Ket language.

Key evidence by current comparative methodologies includes homologies in verb prefixes and also a systematic correspondence between the distribution of Ket tones and consonant articulations found in Athabaskan–Eyak–Tlingit. Vajda's paper has been favorably reviewed by several experts on Na-Dene and Yeniseic languages, including Michael Krauss, Jeff Leer, James Kari, and Heinrich Werner, as well as a number of other well-known linguists, including Bernard Comrie, Johanna Nichols, Victor Golla, Michael Fortescue, and Eric Hamp. The conclusion of this seminar was that the comparison with Yeniseic data shows that Haida cannot be classified in a genealogical unit with Athabaskan–Eyak–Tlingit.

Other proposals
According to Joseph Greenberg's controversial classification of the languages of Native North America, Na-Dené (including Haida) is one of the three main groups of Native languages spoken in the Americas. Contemporary supporters of Greenberg's theory, such as Merritt Ruhlen, have suggested that the Na-Dené language family represents a distinct migration of people from Asia into the New World that occurred six to eight thousand years ago, placing it around four thousand years later than the previous migration into the Americas by Amerind speakers; this remains an unproven hypothesis. Ruhlen speculates that the Na-Dené speakers may have arrived in boats, initially settling near the Haida Gwaii, now in British Columbia, Canada.

A fringe hypothesis by Sergei Starostin suggested that Na-Dené (including Haida) may belong to the much broader Dené–Caucasian superfamily, which also contains the North Caucasian languages, Sino-Tibetan languages, and Yeniseian languages. This proposal is rejected by nearly all current linguists.

Around 1920 linguist Edward Sapir became convinced that Na–Dené was more closely related to Sino–Tibetan than to other American families. He suggested that the Sino-Tibetan languages are related to Na-Dené. Edward Vadja's Dené–Yeniseian proposal renewed interest among linguists such as Geoffrey Caveney (2014) to look into support for the Sino–Dené hypothesis. Caveney considered a link between Sino–Tibetan, Na–Dené, and Yeniseian to be plausible but did not support the hypothesis that Sino–Tibetan and Na–Dené were related to the North Caucasian languages (Sino–Caucasian and Dené–Caucasian).

Obstruent correspondences
This phonological chart shows where the listed varieties have sounds which are the same, similar, and sometimes different. The sounds shown, obstruents, are a particular class of consonants. Where similarities are found between one or more varieties, this presents at least some evidence of genetic relatedness among those varieties. 

Table notes:
To prevent cluttering the table, phonemes in the PAET, PAE and PA columns are not asterisked.
Judging from their rarity, he assumes they may be attributable to the resolution of former consonant clusters.
In Athabaskan and Eyak, sibilants can be diminutive variants of shibilants. In Tlingit, on the other hand, shibilants might sometimes be diminutive variants of sibilants. These correspondences are in parentheses.

Footnotes

See also 
 Dené–Yeniseian languages
 Athabaskan languages
 Southern Athabaskan languages

Footnotes

References

.
.
.
.
.
.
.
.
.
.
.
.
.
.
.
.

.
.
.
.
.
. 
.
. 
.
. 
.
.
.
.
.
.
.
.
.

External links 

 Alaska Native Language Center
 Athabaskan word comparison table
 Dené–Yeniseian / Na-Dené Swadesh lists (incomplete)

 
Language families
Dené–Yeniseian languages